"Candyman" is a song written and produced by British rock band Siouxsie and the Banshees.  It was released as the second single from their seventh studio album, Tinderbox.

The song is about child abuse. Musically, it is a guitar-based number with distinctive use of arpeggios by John Valentine Carruthers. Melody Maker hailed the single upon its release, saying it was "thrilling". [...] "Big and brash and clashing, its many parts combine to form one spirited, unpredictable yet wholly co-ordinated outburst while Siouxsie's voice, in confident control, bounces up and down and around the repeating motifs, and unexpected twist of arrangements."

"Candyman" became Siouxsie and the Banshees' 13th top 40 hit, peaking at number 34 in the UK Singles Chart.

References 

1986 singles
Siouxsie and the Banshees songs
1986 songs
Songs written by Siouxsie Sioux
Songs written by Budgie (musician)
Songs written by Steven Severin
Polydor Records singles
Songs about child abuse